Six Mile Grove is a five-piece alternative country band based in Rochester, Minnesota.

Biography 
Six Mile Grove was founded in 1997 in Lyle, Minnesota (population 566) by brothers Brandon and Brian Sampson, Barry Nelson and Dezi Wallace. Their first rehearsals were held in the Sampsons' grandmother's farm home. The group is known for an Americana/alt-country/roots rock sound.

In 2004 they began a collaboration with Johnny Cash guitarist Bob Wootton. In a 2011 interview, Wootton stated, "There's nothing fancy about them and they don't try to be something they're not. And that's what I like about them."

In 2012 Six Mile Grove released their sixth studio album, Secret Life in a Quiet Town.

Members 
 Brandon Sampson - Lead vocals, rhythm guitar, and harmonica
 Barry Nelson - Backing vocals, Wurlitzer, Hammond Organ, piano and lead guitar
 Dezi Wallace - Bass guitar, banjo, and mandolin
 Brian Sampson - Drums and percussion
 John Wheeler - Pedal steel, dobro, accordion

Studio albums 
 A Day's Work (1997)
 Long Distance Everything (1998)
 Friction (2000)
 Bumper Crop (2004)
 Steel Mule (2008)
 Secret Life in a Quiet Town (2012)
 Million Birds (2018)

Live albums
 Live from the Rochester Civic Theatre (2010)

Awards 
"Vs. The World" Ranked #4 by Roots Highway Radio (Italy)
"Later On" Ranked #19 by Roots Highway Radio (Italy)
"Bumper Crop" Ranked #21 by American Roots Music Top 100 Chart
"Bumper Crop" Ranked #26 by Freeform American Roots Chart
"Man of Steel" Ranked #2 by Moxie Radio Top 20 Chart

References

External links 
 

American alternative country groups
Musical groups established in 1997
Six Mile Grove